This is a list of lists of composers grouped by various criteria.

Name
List of composers by name

Women
List of female composers by name
List of female composers by birth date
List of Australian female composers

Genre
Anime composer
List of Carnatic composers
List of film score composers
List of major opera composers
List of composers of musicals
List of musicals by composer: A to L, M to Z
List of ragtime composers
List of sports television composers
List of symphony composers
List of acousmatic-music composers
 List of Spaghetti Western composers
List of television theme music composers

Era
List of classical music composers by era
List of Medieval composers
List of Renaissance composers
List of Baroque composers
List of Classical-era composers
List of Romantic-era composers
List of 20th-century classical composers
List of 21st-century classical composers

Nationality or ethnicity

 Chronological lists of classical composers by nationality
 List of composers by nationality

Instrument
List of composers for the classical guitar
List of organ composers
List of piano composers
List of composers and their preferred lyricists
List of string quartet composers

Classification
 Chronological lists of classical composers
 List of Anglican church composers – See also Religious music
 List of composers of African descent
 List of composers of Caribbean descent
 List of modernist composers
 List of Byzantine composers
 List of composers in literature

See also
Lists of musicians
Lists of singers
List of singer-songwriters – see also Pop music and Rock music

External links
Sheet music by composer at the International Music Score Library Project
Famous composers